This is a list of the Australian moth species of the family Plutellidae. It also acts as an index to the species articles and forms part of the full List of moths of Australia.

Chrysorthenches callibrya (Turner, 1923)
Chrysorthenches lagarostrobi Dugdale, 1996
Chrysorthenches microstrobi Dugdale, 1996
Diathryptica proterva Meyrick, 1907
Diathryptica theticopis Turner, 1923
Leuroperna sera (Meyrick, 1885)
Mychonoa mesozona Meyrick, 1893
Orthenches epiphricta Meyrick, 1907
Orthenches liparochroa Turner, 1923
Orthenches pleurosticta Turner, 1923
Phalangitis crymorrhoa Meyrick, 1907
Phalangitis pellochroa Turner, 1913
Phalangitis triaria Meyrick, 1907
Phalangitis tumultuosa Meyrick, 1907
Phalangitis veterana Meyrick, 1907
Plutella australiana Landry & Hebert, 2013
Plutella psammochroa Meyrick, 1885
Plutella xylostella (Linnaeus, 1758)
Tonza purella Walker, 1864
Tritymba acrospila (Turner, 1927)
Tritymba aulophora (Meyrick, 1918)
Tritymba dasybathra Lower, 1894
Tritymba dianipha (Turner, 1926)
Tritymba diatoma (Turner, 1923)
Tritymba ochrocera (Turner, 1923)
Tritymba pamphaea (Turner, 1923)
Tritymba stichogramma (Turner, 1923)
Tritymba xanthocoma Lower, 1894

References

External links 
Plutellidae at Australian Faunal Directory

Australia